

Pakistan at the 1994 Commonwealth Games was abbreviated PAK.

Medals

Gold
none

Silver
none

Bronze
Arshad Hussain — Boxing, Men's Lightweight 
Muhammad Umar — Wrestling, Men's Lightweight
Muhammad Bhola — Wrestling, Men's Middleweight

1994
Commonwealth Games
Nations at the 1994 Commonwealth Games